Glove is a 2011 South Korean sports drama film directed by Kang Woo-suk based on a true story. After a drunken fiasco, fading baseball star Sang-nam is forced to coach kids at a school for the deaf and hard of hearing, but the publicity stunt eventually becomes an opportunity of a lifetime. The film was released to South Korean cinemas on January 20 and went on to receive 1,890,406 admissions nationwide during its run in theaters.

Plot
Kim Sang-nam (Jung Jae-young), a hot-tempered professional baseball player, is sent to the countryside to coach a team of deaf and hard of hearing players in order to avoid media coverage of his recent involvement in an assault case. At first, Sang-nam has a difficult time imagining how he can teach baseball to a group of boys who can’t hear, but as he spends time with them he starts to believe that they can play the game. Motivated, Sang-nam decides to help them prepare for the nationals. As Sang-nam trains them, he forms bonds with the players, as well as with the music teacher and baseball manager Ms. Na (Yoo Sun). But things don’t go the way Kim plans and their difficulties communicating with one another exacerbates the situation.

Cast
 Jung Jae-young as Kim Sang-nam
 Yoo Sun as Na Joo-won
 Kang Shin-il as Vice Principal
 Cho Jin-woong as Charles
 Kim Hye-seong as Jang Dae-geun
 Lee Hyun-woo as Kim Jin-man
 Jang Ki-bum as Cha Myeong-jae
 Kwon Eun-soo as Sang-mi	
 Kim Mi-kyung as nun principal
 Kim Dong-yeong as Jo Jang-hyeok
 Ji Il-joo as Oh Cheol-jin
 Jo Chan-hyeong as Lee Cheol-seung
 Jeong Gyoo-soo as police chief at police sub-station
 Jeon Kook-hwan as group leader Goo
 Jo Kyeong-sook as Myeong-jae's mother
 Lee Hae-yeong as professional baseball player
 Oh Hee-joon as Bully
 Jin Kyung as Nun teacher

References

External links
  
 GLove at Naver 
 
 
 

2011 films
2010s sports drama films
South Korean sports drama films
South Korean baseball films
Films about parasports
Sports films based on actual events
Drama films based on actual events
Films directed by Kang Woo-suk
2010s Korean-language films
Publicity stunts in fiction
2011 drama films
South Korean films based on actual events
2010s South Korean films